Boztepe is a village in Tarsus district of Mersin Province, Turkey situated in the Taurus Mountains. The population of Boztepe was 287 as of 2011.

References

Villages in Tarsus District